Fatal Love may refer to:

 Fatal Love (play), a 1680 tragedy by the English writer Elkanah Settle
 an alternative name of the 1992 television movie Something to Live for: The Alison Gertz Story
 Fatal Love (1993 film), a 1993 Hong Kong Category III film, see List of Hong Kong Category III films
 Fatal Love (1988 film), a 1988 Hong Kong film directed by Leong Po-Chih
 Fatal Love, Monsta X's third Korean studio album

See also

 Fatal (disambiguation)
 Love (disambiguation)